The African-American Cemetery, known historically as the Colored Cemetery, in the town of Montgomery, New York, United States, holds the graves of roughly 100 humans, mostly believed to be African slaves who were brought over by the earliest settlers of the region from the Rhenish Palatinate in the mid-18th century. It is located on NY 416 a tenth of a mile (160 m) north of the Interstate 84 crossing, near the Wallkill River.

All the originally marked graves that have been identified have had the stones used to mark them supplemented with small pipes. Only two have any kind of discernible inscription, one of which dates its occupant's passing to 1756.

The site had grown neglected until the town and private donors undertook to fix it up in the early 1990s. It was fully restored and rededicated, with a new wooden fence and explanatory plaque, in 1995. 

It was added to the National Register of Historic Places in 1996.

References

Cemeteries in Orange County, New York
National Register of Historic Places in Orange County, New York
Cemeteries on the National Register of Historic Places in New York (state)
Slavery in the United States
African-American history of New York (state)
African-American cemeteries in New York (state)